USA (Unconformable Social Amputees) is the second solo studio album by American rapper Saint Dog from the Kottonmouth Kings. It was released on May 16, 2006 by Suburban Noize Records.

Track listing

References

External links
 Unconformable Social Amputees at Discogs

2006 albums
Saint Dog albums
Suburban Noize Records albums